Sunny Xie (born November 28, 1990) is a female Mandarin Chinese singer born in Wuhan, China. She has currently released four albums.

Discography

Cat And Fish 2010

01. 你是貓兒我是魚 – Ni Shi Mao Er Wo Shi Yu

02. 瑪麗叔叔的冒險 – Ma Li Su Su De Gan Mao

03. 蘿蔔白菜各有所愛 – Luo Bo Bai Cai Ming You Suo Ai

04. 你知道我對你的好 – Ni Zhi Dao Wo Dui Ni De Hao

05. 愛情城堡 – Ai Qing Cheng Bao

06. 年華 – Nian Hua

07. 天使愛 – Tian Shi Ai

08. 少年 – Shao Nian

09. 淡藍色的夢想 – Dan Lan Se De Mong Xiang

10. 公主 – Gong Zhu

11. 吃不完的愛 – Chi Bu Wan De Ai

You Do Not Deserve 2011

01.你不配 – Ni Bu Pei

02.你是貓兒我是魚 – Ni Shi Mao Er Wo Shi Yi

03.蘿蔔白菜各有所愛 – Luo Bo Bai Cai Min You Suo Ai

04.你知道我對你的好 – Ni Zhi Dao Wo Dui Ni De Hao

05.公主 – Gong Zhu

06.年華 – Nian Hua

07.天使愛 – Tian Shi Ai

08.少年 – Shao Nian

09.淡藍色的浪漫 – Dan Lan Se De Lang Man

10.瑪麗叔叔的冒險 – Ma Li Shu Shu De Mao Xian

11.愛情城堡 – Ai Qing Cheng Bao

12.吃不完的愛 – Chi Bu Wan De Ai

13.你不配 – Ni Bu Pei

Sunny Xie (self-titled) 2011

1. 那又怎樣 Na You Zen Yang

2. 絨絨草 Rong Rong Cao

3. 偶像派 Ou Xiang Pai

4. Sweet

5. 無關幸福 Wu Guan Xing Fu

6. 學會堅強 Xue Hui Jian Qiang

7. 說好一起 Shou Hai Yi Qi

8. 你知道我對你的好 Ni Zhi Da0 Wo Dui Ni De Hao

9. 我的愛還在 Wo De Ai Hai Zai

10. 故事重播 Gu Shi Chong Bo

11. 你不配 Ni Bu Pei (Rap Version)

Lonely 2013

1. 寂寞

2. Double Face

3. 小白臉

4. 你的愛太囂張

5. Show Girl

6. 愛說話

7. 愛如甲骨文

8. 忘記你是誰

9. 末次見面

10. 不要裝熟

11. 等你

12. 彎月亮

13. 其實我很在乎你

14. Sweet

15. 我不做你娘娘

References

External links

Further reading

Chinese Mandopop singers
Musicians from Wuhan
1990 births
Living people
Singers from Hubei
Actresses from Hubei
21st-century Chinese women singers